Marta Colvin Andrade (1907–1995) was a sculptor from Chillán, Chile.

Biography

Marta Colvin Andrade was the daughter of James Colvin of Irish descent and Elvira Andrade of Portuguese descent. After the 1939 Chillán earthquake, she lived in Santiago, Chile, and studied at the School of Arts. In 1943 she was appointed assistant professor from the sculpture workshop of Julio A. Vasquez and master Lorenzo Domínguez and was officially appointed Professor in 1950. In 1948 she attended the Grande Chaumiere Academie in Paris with masters Ossian Zadkine and Henry Laurens. She went on to live in France for more than thirty years. In 1965 she took part in the first Sao Paulo Biennale. She was known worldwide and awarded the National Art Prize in 1970 in recognition of her works.

She died in Santiago on 27 October 1995.

Sculpture in museum collections

 Silvia, 1946, bronze, 80 x 43 x 50 cm, Santiago Museum of Contemporary Art
 Danza para tu sombra, 1952, granit, 3,5 x 3 x 2,8 m, tomb of the dancer Isabel Glatzel, General Santiago Cemetery 
 Buste de Benjamín Vicuña Mackenna, 1952, Square de l'Amérique-Latine, Paris
 Homenaje a la Neurocirugía, 1953, bronze, 3 m tall, Instituto de Neurocirugía, Santiago
 Eslabón, 1956, sycamore wood, 64cm de hauteur, Museo Nacional de Bellas Artes, Santiago
 Quinchamalí, 1956, wood, 1.27 x 0.55 x 0.5 m; Parque de las Esculturas Marta Colvin de Chillán
 Manutara, 1957, bronze, 1,6 m, Battersea Park, London
 Terra Mater, 1957, bois, 2 m; Pinacoteca de la Universidad de Concepción
 Andes, 1959, bronze, 0,50 m, Palais du Quirinal, Rome
 Yo sostengo tu cruz, 1960, bois, 2,3 m; Benedictine Monastery  of the Santísima Trinidad de Las Condes, Santiago
 Signo solar / Grand Signe, 1963, Andes stone, 2,4 x 2 x 2,2 m, Musée de la sculpture en plein air, Paris
 Monumento a Laurita Lagos, 1964, Chillán stone, 3 m, Cimetiere de Chillán
 Las torres del silencio, 1960-1963, stone, 3,5 x 1,25 x 0,5 m, Musée de sculpture en plein air de Middelheim
 Vigías, 1968, polished wood, 2 m tall; Museo Nacional de Bellas Artes, Santiago
 Le Grand Signe, 1970, bronze, 2,4 x 2 x 2,2 m, Musée de la sculpture en plein air, Paris
 Mural de Osaka, 1970, stone and copper, Museum of Osaka
 Puerta del Sol, 1970, red Andes stone, Museum of Pontoise
 Señal del bosque / Signal en forêt, 1971, wood, 4,5 x 4 x 2 m, Forest of Sénart
 El árbol de la vida, 1971, stone, Centro Cultural Gabriela Mistral, Santiago
 Carrefour de l'esprit, 1972, wood, 4,5 x 4 x 2 m, College of Villepinte
 Caleuche (Nef), 1975, Andes stone, 3.5 x 2 x 2 m, port of Saint-Nazaire
 Victoire, 1978, stone, 4 x 3 x 2 m, Régiment Bouliac, Bordeaux
 Léviathan, 1977, wood, 4.5 x 3 x 3 m, Lycée Professionnel "Professeur Clerc" in Outreau (Pas-de-Calais)
 Mélusine, 1978, stone, 2,5 m, Collège de la Crèche, Niort
 Rosa de los vientos, 1979, stone, 3,60 x 3 x 3 m, Faculté d'Ontologie de l'Université de Paris
 Homenaje a los templarios, 1981, stone, 4 x 3,5 x 3 m, Ville Nouvelle de Saint-Quentin-en-Yvelines
 Espíritu del agua, 1982, bronze, 3 x 2 x 1,5 m, Plaza del General de Gaulle, Marly-le-Roi
 Vigía del mar, 1983, granite, 6,5 x 3 x 2 m, Fort Crozon, Brest, France
 Horizonte andino, 1986, stone, 0,21 x 0,46 x 0,16 m, Museo de Artes Visuales, Santiago
 Madre Tierra / Pachamama, 1986, red Andes stone, 4.18 x 1.26 x 1.04 m, Museo Parque de las Esculturas de Santiago
 Himno al trabajo, 1989, polychromed wood, Cámara Chilena de la Construcción, Santiago
 Señal de oriente y occidente / Signal, 1991, polychromed wood, 3.5 m, Sculpture park of Séoul
 Alas al viento, stone, sculpture park, University of Talca
 Monumento a Sucre'', Plaza Sucre, Ñuñoa, Santiago

References

1907 births
1995 deaths
20th-century sculptors
20th-century Chilean women artists
People from Chillán
Chilean people of Irish descent
Chilean people of Portuguese descent
Chilean sculptors
Chilean women sculptors
Chilean expatriates in France